Widnes was a county constituency in England, based on the town of Widnes, in Lancashire.  It returned one Member of Parliament (MP) to the House of Commons of the Parliament of the United Kingdom, elected by the first past the post voting system.

History
The constituency was formed as a Parliamentary division of Lancashire in 1885, including Allerton, Cronton, Ditton, Garston, Hale, Halewood, Huyton with Roby, Little Woolton, Much Woolton, Speke, Tarbock, Whiston and Widnes.

In 1918 it was redefined to cover the municipal borough of Widnes, along with the urban districts of Prescot and Huyton with Roby and the Whiston Rural District.  The two urban districts and part of the rural district (the parishes of Eccleston, Kirkby, Knowsley, and Windle) became part of a new Huyton constituency in 1950, with Widnes retaining the borough and the remainder of the rural district. In 1971 Widnes featured the last by-election to date to have only a Labour and a Conservative candidate. Its boundaries remained unchanged in 1974.  In 1983 Widnes constituency was abolished and replaced by Halton constituency.

Members of Parliament

Election results

Elections in the 1970s

Elections in the 1960s

Elections in the 1950s

Elections in the 1940s

Elections in the 1930s

Elections in the 1920s

Elections in the 1910s

Elections in the 1900s

Elections in the 1890s

Elections in the 1880s

References

Sources 

Parliamentary constituencies in North West England (historic)
Constituencies of the Parliament of the United Kingdom established in 1885
Constituencies of the Parliament of the United Kingdom disestablished in 1983
Borough of Halton